Desmond Edward Hoare (born 19 October 1934) is a former Australian cricketer who played in one Test match in 1961. He also played Australian rules football for East Fremantle in the West Australian National Football League (WANFL).

Life and career
A tall fast bowler and useful lower-order batsman, Hoare played for Western Australia from 1955–56 to 1965–66. He was selected for the Fourth Test against the West Indies in 1960–61, replacing the injured Alan Davidson. He took the wickets of Conrad Hunte and Frank Worrell and made 35 in a ninth-wicket partnership of 85 with Richie Benaud in the drawn match. Davidson returned to the team for the Fifth Test.

Hoare was not selected for the tour to England in 1961, and when the Australian touring team played Western Australia at the end of the 1960–61 season, he opened the batting for Western Australia and hit 133, his only century. His best bowling figures were 8 for 98 and 2 for 55 against New South Wales in 1964–65. In 1959–60 he took 6 for 18 off 6 overs to dismiss South Australia for 56; when Western Australia needed only 23 wins to win in the fourth innings, he and the 18-year-old Graham McKenzie, playing his second match for Western Australia, opened the innings and scored the runs to give Western Australia victory by 10 wickets.

Hoare played as the professional for Nelson in the Lancashire League in 1963 and 1964. He stayed in England in the off-season, working for a brewery, and missing the 1963–64 season in Australia. He used this experience later in his work as a sales representative for Swan Brewery in Perth.

References

External links
 

1934 births
Living people
Australia Test cricketers
Australian cricketers
Australian rules footballers from Western Australia
Cricketers from Perth, Western Australia
East Fremantle Football Club players
International Cavaliers cricketers
Western Australia cricketers